Yegoshikha, formerly Yagoshikha, was a village on the Yegoshikha River in the 17th–18th centuries. It is famous for its historical significance as oldest mentioned settlement at the place of the foundation of the city of Perm.

Yegoshikha was founded in 1568. It was first mentioned in the voivod (commander) Prokopy Yelizarov 1647 census book:

In the 1687 census books of prince Feodor Belsky it was written:

In 1692, this settlement was already mentioned as the village of Yegoshikha.  The village was also sometimes called Bryukhanovo for the family name of its first residents.

In 1723, after the copper deposit was discovered there,
Yegoshikha Copper Factory was founded at the bank of Yegoshikha by Vasily Tatishchev, the chief manager of the Ural factories. In 1781, the workers' settlement was reorganized as the city of Perm by the decree of Catherine II.

References

 , 1986.
 , 1889.

External links
 
Historical information on the foundation of Perm

Perm, Russia
Geography of Perm Krai
Populated places established in 1568